MV Cape Hudson (T-AKR-5066) was originally built as a commercial ship in 1979 and sold to the Wilhelmsen Line with the name Barber Taif.

Construction and career 
It served as a merchant ship until it was purchased by the US Department of Transportation, Maritime Administration in December 1986. 

On 15 August 1990, she was reactivated for Operation Desert Storm and Operation Desert Shield until 20 May 1992.

She conducted anchor tests south of Angel Island, San Francisco Bay on 28 July 2007. 

From there it was later transferred to the Maritime Administrations Ready reserve fleet and assigned to San Francisco.

Further reading
(https://web.archive.org/web/20120616101648/http://www.msc.navy.mil/inventory/ships.asp?ship=37) Military Sealift Command Ship Inventory
(http://www.navsource.org/archives/09/54/545066.htm) NavSource Online: Service Ship Photo Archive

References

Ships built in Norway
1978 ships
Gulf War ships of the United States